Netuma is a genus of sea catfishes found in the Indian Ocean and the western Pacific Ocean where it occurs in marine, brackish and fresh waters from the coasts of Africa to Australia to China. There are currently three described species in this genus.

Species
There are currently 4 described species:
 Netuma bilineata (Valenciennes, 1840) (Bronze catfish)
Netuma patriciae 
 Netuma proxima (J. D. Ogilby, 1898) (Arafura catfish)
 Netuma thalassina (Rüppell, 1837) (Giant catfish)

References
 

Ariidae
Catfish genera
Taxa named by Pieter Bleeker